Clara Corral Aller (Ourense, 8 June 1847 - A Coruña, 9 February 1908) was a Galician poet, the second woman to publish a text in Galician language during the 19th century, after Rosalía de Castro. Daughter of Dimas Corral Rebellón and Clara Aller Presas, in 1852 she moved with her family to Lugo. Orphaned by her father and mother, she moved with her sisters Consuelo and Rita to Santiago de Compostela in 1868 and devoted herself to her literary work. Their poems appeared in the press of the time, El Diario de Santiago, Revista Compostelana de Instrucción y Recreo and La Ilustración Gallega y Asturiana. In 1884 she moved to A Coruña with his brother and sister-in-law. In 1891, he published “A Herminia”, dedicated to his orphaned niece, daughter of his sister Rita, who was, like her, a corresponding member of the Royal Galician Academy, created in 1906. In 1980 was published Poesias en gallego y castellano. Clara Corral Aller 1847-1908, collection by Dimas Romero Vázquez. In Ourense, his hometown, there is a street with his name and surname in her honor.

References

Bibliography 
 

Galician poets
Spanish women writers
19th-century Spanish writers
20th-century Spanish writers
1847 births
Galician-language writers
1908 deaths
20th-century Spanish women